Sergio Matabuena Delgado (born 12 February 1979) is a Spanish retired footballer who played as a defensive midfielder.

Club career
Matabuena was born in Santander, Cantabria. A product of his hometown club Racing de Santander's youth system, he made his debut in La Liga on 17 November 2002 in a 1–2 home loss against RCD Mallorca, and scored his first goals in the following season.

Never an undisputed starter, Matabuena would be a mere training partner upon Gonzalo Colsa's return to Racing in 2006 and, after only five appearances during 2006–07, he moved to Sporting de Gijón in the second division, being instrumental in helping them achieve a 2008 top flight return. In a campaign in which he collected 14 yellow cards (also netting two late goals in a 2–2 draw at Córdoba CF), he earned the affectionate nickname "Matabuena Gattuso".

Matabuena appeared significantly less in the following top level seasons – 14 matches in 2009–10 – being only second or third-choice holding midfielder. On 13 January 2011, at nearly 32, he returned to the second level and signed for Real Valladolid.

References

External links

1979 births
Living people
Spanish footballers
Footballers from Santander, Spain
Association football midfielders
La Liga players
Segunda División players
Segunda División B players
Tercera División players
Rayo Cantabria players
Racing de Santander players
Sporting de Gijón players
Real Valladolid players